The Italian Air Force has gone under different names in different periods:

Regia Aeronautica (Royal Air Force), from 1923 to June 1946
Aeronautica Nazionale Repubblicana, the air force of Italian Social Republic during World War II
Italian Co-Belligerent Air Force, formed in October 1943 whose pilots flew with the Allies
Aeronautica Militare, after World War II